Primera División A (Méxican First A Division) Clausura 2008 is a Méxican football tournament – one of two  tournaments held in one year. It began Friday, January 11, 2008. Reigning champions Indios could not defend their title, as Club León wins their 3rd title in Primera División A, and earned the right to battle Indios in a two-leg aggregate to try to earn promotion to the Primera División de México. In the 1st leg, which was played at Estadio Olímpico Benito Juárez, Indios defeated León by a score of 1–0. In the 2nd leg at Estadio León resulted in a 2–2 tie, hence earning Indios a spot into the Primera División.

Group league tables

Group 1

Group 2

General league table

Liguilla

Promotional Final

First Leg

Second leg

Top scorers

2007–08 in Mexican football
Mex
Ascenso MX seasons